The National Order of Merit is a French order of merit with membership awarded by the President of the French Republic, founded 3 December 1963 by President Charles de Gaulle. The order was established to replace the number of ministerial orders previously awarded by numerous ministries, and to create an award for French citizens as well as foreign nationals for distinguished civil or military achievements, though of a lesser level than that required for the award of the Legion of Honour.

Albania
Officier
Beqir Ajazi (2002) Editor-in-chief of the "Atdheu" newspaper 
Knight
Ferit Hoxha
Valter Gjoni (2002)

Argentina 
Officier
Commodore Herberto J. Vicentini. (1987) Argentina Air Force

Armenia
Ara Babloyan, politician, pediatrician, President of the National Assembly of Armenia
Narek Sargsyan, architect, Minister of Urban Development of Armenia , 1st february 2010
Vigen Sargsyan, politician, Defence minister of Armenia 
Mher Shahgeldyan politician

Australia
Grand Cross
Mary, Crown Princess of Denmark, Australian born member of the Danish royal family. Mary still holds Australian citizenship.

Grand Officer
Penelope Wensley, former Australian state governor

Commander
 General Angus Campbell, Chief of the Defence Force
 Vice Admiral Russ Crane, former Chief of Navy

Knight
Tina Arena Singer-songwriter, recording artist, musical theatre actress, record producer.
 Commodore Timothy Brown Royal Australian Navy, Director General Submarines.
 Professor Katherine Daniell BEng(Civil)(Hons)/BA (Adel.), PhD (ANU/AgroParisTech, France), MIEAust, Australian National University. 
Chris Perrin Australian Naval Veteran. Investiture 25 April 2014
 Serge Thomann, Councillor and Deputy Mayor of the City of Port Phillip (2008-2016), entrepreneur, photographer. Investiture 7 March 2019 at Raheen by French Ambassador Mr Christophe Penot.

Austria
Felix Ermacora Austrian politician and human rights expert.
Sabine Herlitschka CEO of Infineon Technologies Austria
Andreas Maislinger, Founder of the Austrian Holocaust Memorial Service (Gedenkdienst).
Christian H. Schierer, Austrian Trade Commissioner and Commercial Counsellor at the Austrian Embassy

Belgium
Bruno Bernard Belgian writer and export expert

Bosnia and Herzegovina
Asim Behaderović criminologist and police officer (Bosnia and Herzegovina)

Brazil
Prof. Nelson Maculan Filho, D.H.R., Brazilian scientist

Canada
Grand Officer

Roméo LeBlanc Former Governor General.

Officier
Vice-Admiral Maurice Frank Ronald "Ron Lloyd" CMM CD Commander of the Royal Canadian Navy (Officer level of this medal) Awarded on 4 November 2017

Chevalier/Knight
Marlène Harnois Olympic medalist.
David R. Low (awarded in 1988) former Chairman of the Interdepartmental Committee on Space, Vice President of Spar Aerospace and inaugural General Manager of Radarsat International. Former Assistant Secretary to Cabinet in the Privy Council Office and Deputy Secretary in the Ministry of State for Science and Technology.
Douglas T. Wright (1993) Engineer and civil servant. President, and Vice-Chancellor of the University of Waterloo, 1981 to 1993.  Fellow of the Canadian Academy of Engineering and of the Engineering Institute of Canada.  Recipient of the Gold Medal of the Canadian Council of Professional Engineers and a founding member of the Prime Minister's National Advisory Board on Science and Technology.

Czech Republic
Jaroslav Šedivý
Michaela Šojdrová (2009)
Meda Mládková (2016)
Commander
Petr Pavel

Dominican Republic
Chevalier/Knight
Ana Rosa Amalia Berges Dreyfous (2009) Juris Doctor, university professor and judge of the Supreme Court of the Dominican Republic

Haiti
Gary Victor (2001) award-winning writer, playwright

Hong Kong
T. K. Ann, industrialist, legislator and sinologist

Iceland 
Chevalier/Knight
 Einar Hermannsson (2017)
 Ágúst Válfells (father, born in 1934) (1965)

India
Chevalier/Knight
 Narinder Kumar Mehra (2003)
 Rajiv Singhal (2014)
 Ilika Mann (2014)
 Bharat Salhotra (2015)
 Sivaji Ganesan
 Biren Ghose (2021)
 Ruchira Gupta (2017)

Officier
 Villoo Morawala-Patell (2008)

Iran
Grand Cross
Safi Asfia, engineer and statesman

Ireland
 Brigadier General Barney McMahon, Irish Air Corps officer, for his work in promoting Franco-Irish co-operation in military aviation.
Chevalier
 Professor Kathleen O'Flaherty (1972), academic, writer and Professor of French at University College Cork

Italy

Commander
 Maestro Goffredo Petrassi, Italian Composer and Conductor. Awarded on 12 December 1980  (awarded with Commander grade of this medal)

Jamaica

Chevalier
Paulette Ramsay, Author, Researcher and Professor at the University of the West Indies, Mona Campus.

Japan
 Empress Michiko of Japan
Chevalier/Knight
 Mari Miura
 Mizuho Fukushima

Kenya
Commander
Dr.Njoroge Mungai Kenya Foreign Affairs Minister and Businessman

Kosovo
Officer
Valon Murtezaj Professor in Paris and a Kosovan politician

Lebanon
Officier
General Ziad Haykal
 Adnan Kassar
General Maroun Hitti
General shamel roukoz

Chevalier/Knight
Professor Sanaa Sabbah
Nada Sardouk
Nora  Joumblatt

Malaysia
Chevalier / Knight
Alvin Michael Hew (2004) - L'Oreal Managing Director Malaysia & Taiwan - awarded by President Jacques Chirac
SM Nasarudin SM Nasimuddin - NAZA bizman.
 Jamaliyah Ambia (1996) - She served as the Head of French bank, La Societe Generale for 15 years in Malaysia (1983-1998), was President of l'Alliance Française de Kuala Lumpur (AFKL) for 10 years (1996-2006), member, treasurer and Deputy President of AFKL since 1978, former president of non profit NGO Soroptimist Malaysia, together with Tunku Dato’ Seri Utama Naquiyuddin they both were founding members of MAFRETA (Malaysia-France Economic & Trade Association) and was Director of Marketing at Airbus Group Malaysia for 14 years (2003-2017). Currently works as a consultant for various French defence companies in Malaysia and Singapore. She was awarded by the French government in 1996 for promoting trade, investment and culture between France and Malaysia.

Commander
Ambassador Mohamed bin Haron
Airasia CEO Tony Fernandes

Officier
Datin Chan-Low Kam Yoke (2005), Group CEO, HELP University appointed by President Jacques Chirac for her contribution to the development of educational and cultural collaboration between France and Malaysia
Md Zabid Abdul Rashid, Vice Chancellor and President Universiti Tun Abdul Razak (Malaysia)

Mexico
Grand Officier
Lic. Víctor Manuel Villaseñor (1970), Mexican politician and industrialist. He manufactured Renault automobiles in Mexico from 1960 to 1970.
Officier
 Mr. Ángel Barraza y del Toro (1975) Commercial  attaché to the Mexican embassy in France from 1974 to 1975.

New Zealand
Officier
Professor Keith Val Sinclair, New Zealand born academic and Professor of French at the James Cook University of North Queensland.

Chevalier
 Mr Reece Discombe (1966), New Zealand engineer and diver for re-locating Comte de la Perouse's two lost vessels in 1962. He was awarded by President Charles de Gaulle in 1966.
Mr Dermot Neill (1979).
Mr Robert Kingscote (1982).
Mr Lloyd Upton (1997).
Ms Beverley Randell Price (2005), in recognition of her role in the development of relations and friendship between New Zealand and France by offering Randell Cottage as a writer's residence.
Professor Emerita Jocelyn Harris (2006), French Honorary Consul to Dunedin.
Ms Martine Marshall-Durieux (2008), High School French teacher and President of the Alliances Francaises of Christchurch.
Ms Frances James (2010), French teacher and journalist in recognition of work to present a positive image of France and awaken people's interest and love for that country.
Ms Judith Trotter CMNZ (2010), New Zealand's Ambassador to France from 1987 to 1992, and chair of the France-New Zealand Friendship Fund from 2002 to 2008.
Ms Marie Brown (2010), teacher of French and French literature from 1977 and especially president of the Alliances Francaises of Wellington from 2002 to 2004.
Mrs Stephanie Richards (2011), for contributions to the strengthening of ties between France and New Zealand, especially during her time as the head of Thales NZ.

Netherlands
 King Willem-Alexander of the Netherlands.
 Queen Máxima of the Netherlands
 Caroline van Eck

Niger
Mariama Hima, ambassador of Niger in France between 1996 and 2003

North Macedonia
Commander
Radmila Šekerinska

Norway
Queen Sonja of Norway.

Pakistan
Riaz Piracha, foreign secretary
Major General Rehmat Khan
Commodore Suhail Hameed SI(M)
Shabir Ahmed, CEO of DL Nash (Pvt) Ltd
Marvi Memon, politician
 Dr. Asad Asghar Ali, Regional Director GEC Alstom, Pakistan.

Palestine
Knight
Dr. Amal Daraghmeh Masri, businesswoman, founder and Editor-in-Chief of Middle East Business magazine and news, founding member of 'Palestine Accueil', President of Palestine-France Business Council. Awarded Feb 2017.

Paraguay 
Officer

Concepción Leyes de Chaves

Portugal
Chevalier
Rogerio Walter Carreira, Directeur ALSTOM au Mozambique

Romania
Chevalier
Ionela Băluță
Radu Mircea Berceanu
Commander
Nicolae Ciucă

Samoa
 Officier
Vaimasenu'u Zita Sefo-Martel Honorary Consul of France, Business and Sports Woman
Norman Paul†‡ Former Honorary Consul of France and Businessman

Saudi Arabia
Grand Officier
Sultan bin Abdulaziz Al Saud

Senegal
Léopold Sédar Senghor Poet, politician, and cultural theorist.

Serbia
Grand Officer
Radomir Diklić, Diplomat.

Commander
Pavle Janković, Diplomat.

Officer
Ivan Vejvoda, Social scientist.
Colonel Slavoljub Dabić, Former military attache in Paris.

Knight
Predrag Marić, Civil servant.
Colonel Vojislav Krstović, Military officer.
Nataša Vučković, Parliamentarian.
Dubravka Stojanović, Historian.
Saša Janković, National Ombudsman
Tanja Miščević, Head of the Negotianting Team for the Accession of Serbia to the European Union.
Colonel Zoran Rašeta, Former military attache in Paris.
Stanislav Sretenović, Historian.
Gordana Janićijević, Deputy Public Prosecutor of Serbia.
Nataša Kovačević-Stojaković, former basketball player

South Africa
 Carolyn Steyn, philanthropist and founder of 67 Blankets for Nelson Mandela Day.
 Princess Dr Tebogo Modjadji-Kekana ( Global Philanthropist and Global Chairperson for Gender Equality)
 David Kramer, educator
 Rear Admiral Paul Alexander Wijnberg

Spain
Juan Carlos I of Spain.
Queen Sofia of Spain
Queen Letizia of Spain

Sweden
Eva Nordmark, President of TCO, the Swedish Confederation of Professional Employees.
Fredrik Ljungström, engineer, inventor
Henrik Ekstrand
Karl Engelbrektson, General, Swedish Armed Forces.
Queen Silvia of Sweden
Victoria, Crown Princess of Sweden

Taiwan
Yu Mei-nu, legislator, human rights lawyer

Thailand
Princess Galyani Vadhana, the Princess of Naradhiwas.

Ukraine
Ihor Voronchenko, Ukrainian Vice Admiral and commander of the Ukrainian Navy.

United Arab Emirates
Jamal Sanad Al-Suwaidi, Director-general of the Emirates Center for Strategic Studies and Research.

United Kingdom
Andrew P. Hibbert Lawyer.
John Barbirolli Conductor and cellist.
John McManners Clergyman and historian of religion.
Sir John Chalstrey Surgeon and former Lord Mayor of London
Capt. John Colin Rye, R.A. M.D. of Compagnie Française de l'Afrique Occidentale, U.K. Branch.
Ann Kenrick Secretary-General, Franco-British Council
 Ian Reed, Director, Allied Air Forces Memorial, Elvington, York.
Camilla, Duchess of Cornwall
John Rees, Welsh Development Agency
Martin John McCarthy, Former Director General of Total S.A.

United States
William Bergman, US Army LtColonel, diplomat, scholar.
Enrique Cadenas, scholar at the University of Southern California.
Wesley Clark, US Army General.
Philip Hart Cullom, VADM, USN.
Dan Daniel (1914–1988), American politician and 39th National Commander of the American Legion.
Kelvin Davies, scholar at the University of Southern California.
Bruce Jackson, US scholar.
James L. Jones, USMC General.
Theodor Meron, President of the International Criminal Tribunal for the former Yugoslavia, President of the Mechanism for International Criminal Tribunals, Scholar, Judge.
Stewart Addington Saint-David, Marquis of Saint-Jean-Baptiste, university professor and author; received 30 June 2004
Sumner Shapiro, RADM, USN.
Anthony Zinni, USMC General.
Chris Braun, adVINture, USA
 Martha Carolyn Matheny, The World Bank and IMF, received July 7, 2014
Thomas A. Benes, Major General, USMC, received 26 January 2007
Brian L. Losey, Rear Admiral, USN, received 9 December 2016
Virginie Askinazi, MBA, International School of Broward Board Liaison, received in 2013.
John W. Raymond, USAF
Robert Neller, USMC
Mark A. Milley, USA
James G. Foggo III, USN
T. Michael Moseley, USAF
Dennis E. Petito, Honorary Chair, French American Chamber of Commerce Texas, 2022
Thomas E. Kennedy, US Dept of Defense, 15 March 1991
Steven M. Shepro, USAF

Uruguay 

 Hugo Batalla, Vice president of Uruguay

Yugoslavia
Marshal Josip Broz Tito
Jovanka Broz
Asllan Fazlija

References